Tomorrow and Tomorrow is a 1932 American Pre-Code drama film that was adapted from Philip Barry's play of the same name by Josephine Lovett. It was directed by Richard Wallace and stars Ruth Chatterton, Robert Ames, Paul Lukas, Harold Minjir, Tad Alexander, Walter Walker and Arthur Pierson. It was released on February 5, 1932, by Paramount Pictures.

Cast 
Ruth Chatterton as Eve Redman
Robert Ames as Gail Redman
Paul Lukas as Dr. Nicholas Faber
Harold Minjir as Samuel Gillespie
Tad Alexander as Christian Redman
Walter Walker as Dr. Walter Burke
Arthur Pierson as Spike
Margaret Armstrong as Miss Frazer
Winter Hall as President Adee

See also
The House That Shadows Built (1931) Paramount promotional film with excerpts of Tomorrow and Tomorrow

References

External links 
 

1932 films
American drama films
1932 drama films
Paramount Pictures films
Films directed by Richard Wallace
American black-and-white films
1930s English-language films
1930s American films